"Ain't No Money" is a song written and originally recorded by Rodney Crowell. It was released as a single in 1980 from his album But What Will the Neighbors Think, but it did not chart.

It was later covered by American country music artist Rosanne Cash.  It was released in May 1982 as the first single from the album Somewhere in the Stars.  The song reached number 4 on the Billboard Hot Country Singles & Tracks chart.

Charts

Weekly charts

Year-end charts

References

1982 singles
1980 songs
Rosanne Cash songs
Rodney Crowell songs
Songs written by Rodney Crowell
Columbia Records singles
Song recordings produced by Rodney Crowell